SASM may refer to:

Science and technology 
 SASM, an IDE for NASM assembly language

Military
 Southwest Asia Service Medal, a military award of the United States Armed Forces

Museums
 Strategic Air and Space Museum in Ashland, Nebraska